Aadi Perukku commonly known as the Aadi monsoon festival is a Tamil cultural festival celebrated on the 18th day of the Tamil month of Adi. The festival pays tribute to water's life-sustaining properties. For the blessing of mankind with peace, prosperity and happiness, nature worship in the form of Amman deities are organized to shower Nature's bountiful grace on human beings.

Monsoon festivals of South India

Aadi Perukku is a South Indian Hindu festival celebrated on the 18th day of the Tamil month of Adi (mid-July). The festival coincides with the annual freshes of the rivers and to pay tribute to water's life-sustaining properties. It is celebrated near river basins, water tanks, lakes and wells, etc. of Tamil Nadu when the water level in them rises significantly heralding the onset of Monsoon.

Aadi Perukku, water ritual through religious practice
In India the rivers Ganga and Yamuna, Cauvery, Narmada and Godavari are considered sacred. It is common among people to throw fruits, saffron cloths, etc., when the rivers and lakes are in spate purely based on the belief that these rivers are the species of female deities. Similarly, every temple has sacred wells and tanks, and water in these is considered pure.

Aadi Perukku, otherwise called Padinettam Perukku is a unique occasion dedicated to all the perennial river basins of Tamil Nadu and major lakes water source areas and is intended to celebrate the water rising levels due to the onset of monsoon, which is expected to occur invariably on the 18th day of the solar month, Aadi corresponding to 2 or 3 August every year. Hence "Padinettam perukku" - Padinettu signifies eighteen, and Perukku denotes rising. This festival is observed predominantly by women in Tamil Nadu.

The history of the ritual practice dates back to the ancient period and was patronised by the Kings and royal households. This ritual practice existed in various historical periods. Aadi is the month for sowing, rooting, planting of seeds and vegetation since it is peak monsoon time.

Aadi Perukku festival in river basins and other areas

Apart from people flocking at the waterfalls sources of western ghats for premonsoon and monsoon festivals. People living on the banks of the river beds and other important water generation sources offer pujas to the water goddess and river god.

According to the Tamil calendar, Aadi is the fourth month of the year. The first day of this month, usually falling on 16 July, is celebrated as Aadi Pandigai or Aadi Perukku, which is an important festival to most Tamils, especially newlyweds. The most visible manifestation of the month of Aadi is the huge 'kolams' that are patterned early each morning in front of houses. They are usually bordered with red 'kaavi' and across the front doorway at the top are strung mango leaves. The first of the month is marked with a special puja, followed by a feast with 'payasam' prepared with coconut milk, 'puran poli' and vadai. Traditionally, the family of a 'pudhu maappillai' (new son-in-law) is invited to the girl's house, where the couple is gifted new clothes and other presents.

Aadi is a month of fervour and observances dedicated to the Goddesses related to water and other natural forces (e.g. Mariamman temples, Mundakanniamman temples etc.) where prayers and pujas are offered to propitiate the powerful goddess to seek their protection from the inauspicious aspects that are often associated with the month. No weddings or other similar ceremonies are celebrated during Aadi. It is during this time that the monsoon peaks on the west coast and the rivers of Tamil Nadu, dried in the summer heat, are replenished.

Mulaipari and Aadi Perukku

Mulaipari (Sprouting or germination of Nine Grains or Navadhanyam in a basket or clay mud pots) is a very important ritual, which takes place at almost every village celebration. In its most original form, it was exclusively a women's ritual and was of great importance for the whole village. The participants of the processions carry earthen pots with grown grains (nine different types of grains) inside on their heads and walk towards a river where the content is dissolved. The procession is accompanied by Amman. The ritual is very elaborate. Before the procession starts, special songs and dances (Kummi Pattu, Kummi) are performed. The original meaning of the ritual performance was a request to the village goddess for rain and fertility of land, in order to secure a rich harvest.

References

External links

Tamil festivals
July observances
August observances
Culture of Tiruchirappalli
Festivals in Tamil Nadu
Summer holidays (Northern Hemisphere)